1177 B.C.: The Year Civilization Collapsed is a 2014 non-fiction book about the Late Bronze Age collapse by American archaeologist Eric H. Cline. It was published by Princeton University Press. An updated edition was published in 2021.

Description
The book focuses on Cline's hypothesis for the Late Bronze Age collapse of civilization, a transition period that affected the Egyptians, Hittites, Canaanites, Cypriots, Minoans, Mycenaeans, Assyrians and Babylonians; varied heterogeneous cultures populating eight powerful and flourishing states intermingling via trade, commerce, exchange and "cultural piggybacking," despite "all the difficulties of travel and time." He presents evidence to support a "perfect storm" of "multiple interconnected failures," meaning that more than one natural and man-made cataclysm caused the disintegration and demise of an ancient civilization that incorporated "empires and globalized peoples." This ended the Bronze Age, and ended the Mycenaean, Minoan, Trojan, Hittite, and Babylonian cultures.

Before this book, the leading hypothesis during previous decades attributed the civilizations' collapse mostly to Sea Peoples of unknown origin.

Awards
This book has won the following awards:

Winner of the 2014 Award for the Best Popular Book, American Schools of Oriental Research
Honorable Mention for the 2015 PROSE Award in Archeology & Anthropology, Association of American Publishers
One of The New York Post's Best Books of 2014
One of The Federalist's Notable Books of 2015
One of The Australian's Best Books of the Year in 2014, chosen by filmmaker Bruce Beresford
Selected as the 'Book of the Semester' Fall 2016, David M. Kennedy Center for International Studies at Brigham Young University

See also
 Battle of the Delta
 Etymology of Syria

References

Further reading

 Book review: 
Book review:  University of California (publisher).
Book review:

External links 
 
 Publisher's site for this book
 Professor Cline's video lecture on his book.
 Full text of this book available on JSTOR

12th century BC in Egypt
2014 non-fiction books
21st-century history books
American non-fiction books
Bronze Age cultures
English-language books
History books about the 12th century BC
Mycenaean Greece
Prehistoric Asia
Princeton University Press books
Works about societal collapse